The Capela da Sagrada Família (Chapel of the Holy Family) is a Roman Catholic chapel built in 1769 on the island of Chorão, Goa.

History
The Capela da Sagrada Família, Pandavaddo, Chorão was built on plot gifted from John Pereira and it was built at his expenses by Fr. Honorio Vincente Pereira of Pandavaddo (ord. 23-9-1769). The Provision of 1 September 1769 granted permission for the construction of this Chapel. Fr. Pereira was appointed its first Chaplain by a notification of 5 November 1771. He was also the administrator of the Chapel and finally handed over the charge to the people of the village.

The Chapel was erected on 12 October 1782 and re-built by the Provision of 17 December 1876. It was re-constructed for the second time and the Vicar General of the Archdiocese, Mons Pedro Remigio dos Baretto blesses it on 3 May 1918.

The Chapel has four altars dedicated to the Holy Family (Main Altar), Sacred Heart of Jesus, Sacred Heart of Mary and Our Lady of Fatima.

The Confraternity of the Holy Family erected by a decree. No 5 of 14th Feb 1912, had its rules published in the Boletim Official No.85 of 1920 and approved in 1924. The present one has been approved by a decree of 2-4-1945. There is also a Confraternity of the Christian Doctrine erected by a decree No.107 of 7-10-1955.

Mass is said daily in the Chapel and it has a resident Chaplain.

See also 
Capela de Nossa Senhora da Saúde
Chapel of St. Jerome (Chorão Island)

References

Bibliography
The Island of Chorão (A Historical Sketch) By Francisco Xavier Gomes Catão, Mar Louis Memorial Press, Alwaye (1962)

Roman Catholic chapels in Chorão Island
Roman Catholic chapels in India